In August 1985, the World Wrestling Federation took over the Montreal-based International Wrestling (Lutte Internationale) promotion. Upon joining the WWF roster, IW mainstay Dino Bravo was billed as the WWF Canadian Champion in some Canadian cities until January 1986, when the title was abandoned.

Reigns

See also

Professional wrestling in Canada

References

WWE championships
Canadian professional wrestling championships
1985 establishments in Canada
1986 disestablishments in Canada
Professional wrestling in Montreal
WWE in Canada